Stephen R. George (born 1959) is a Canadian author of horror fiction, suspense and dark fantasy. He writes under his own name and the pseudonyms Jack Ellis and Valerie Stephens.

George has published 14 novels. His novels have been translated into Italian, Polish, Russian, and Norwegian. His short stories have appeared in a number of publications and anthologies including Cemetery Dance and the Hot Blood series.

George was born in Scotland in 1959; he lives and works in Canada.

Novels
 Nightlife (1996) by Jack Ellis, (reprinted 2000)
 Seeing Eye (1995) by Jack Ellis, (reprinted 2000)
 Mirror, Mirror (1994) by Valerie Stephens
 Torment (1994)
 Bloody Valentine (1994)
 Deadly Vengeance (1993)
 Nightscape (1992)
 Near Dead (1992)
 The Forgotten (1991)
 Grandma's Little Darling (1990)
 Dark Reunion (1990)
 Dark Miracle (1989)
 Beasts (1989)
 Brain Child (1989)

See also
List of horror fiction authors

External links
Locus Magazine Online - Stephen R. George entry

Stephen R. George author page at Amazon

Canadian fantasy writers
Living people
1959 births